Geraldine may refer to:

People
 Geraldine (name), the feminine form of the first name Gerald, with list of people thus named.
 The Geraldines, Irish dynasty descended from the Anglo-Norman Gerald FitzWalter de Windsor
 Geraldine of Albania, the Queen Consort of Zog I.

Places
 Geraldine, New Zealand
 Geraldine (New Zealand electorate)
 Geraldine, Alabama, United States
 Geraldine, Montana, United States

Characters
 Geraldine, a character in the poem "Christabel" by Samuel Taylor Coleridge
 Geraldine McQueen (character), a fictional singer, played by Peter Kay
 Geraldine Jones (character), a comedy persona of Flip Wilson
 Geraldine Granger, a fictional character in the British sitcom The Vicar of Dibley
 Geraldine Littlejohn, a character in the film Cyberbully

Films
 Geraldine (1929 film), a 1929 American romantic comedy film
 Geraldine (1953 film), a 1953 American comedy film 
 Geraldine (2000 film), a 2000 French animated short film

Music
 Geraldine, an opera by Michael William Balfe
 "Geraldine" (song), by Glasvegas
 Geraldine, stage name of Geraldine Brannigan

Other
 "Geraldine", adjective (e.g. "Geraldine cause", "Geraldine loyalties") meaning 'having to do with the FitzGerald dynasty' in medieval Ireland
 , a United States Navy patrol boat in commission from 1917 to 1918

See also
 Geraldino (disambiguation)